Federico Jusid (born April 23, 1973) is an Argentine composer who resides and works between Madrid and Los Angeles. He has written the scores for more than 40 feature films and over 25 television series.
His work includes the score for the Academy Award®-winner for Best Foreign Film The Secret in Their Eyes (2009, Dir. by Juan José Campanella), for which he received the nomination for the Spanish Academy Goya Award® for Best Original Score.
He has recently worked with Alberto Iglesias writing additional compositions for the original score of Ridley Scott's Exodus: Gods and Kings, and he has also composed the OST for Kidnap (Luis Prieto) with Halle Berry, and Happy 140 (Gracia Querejeta). Other notable scores include  The Life Unexpected (Jorge Torregrossa), Everybody Has a Plan (Anna Piterbarg), The Escape (Eduardo Mignogna), The Hidden Face (Andrés Baiz), I Want to Be a Soldier (Christian Molina), and more recently Magallanes (Salvador del Solar), Getulio (Joao Jardim), The Ignorance of Blood (Manuel Gómez Pereira), Betibu (Miguel Cohan) or Francis, Father Jorge (Beda Docampo Feijóo). 
On television, his most recognised work is the soundtrack for the Spanish historical drama Isabel, with whom he won several awards, such as International Film Music Critics Association (IFMCA) Award and Reel Music Award. In 2015 he made the score for the TV series Under Suspicion and The Refugees (co-production with BBC International) and just released the historic drama Charles, King Emperor, sequel of Isabel.
He has also composed works for concert hall premiered throughout Europe and America by recognized soloist and chamber ensembles. As a pianist and composer, he has performed and toured prestigious theaters in Europe, Asia and America. He recorded for labels BMG, IRCO, Magenta Discos and Melopea.

Early life and education 
Jusid was born in Buenos Aires, the son of well known Argentine film director Juan José Jusid and actress Luisina Brando. Jusid began studying piano and composition at age seven. Since then, he has been active as composer for the concert hall and piano soloist, performing as a soloist in numerous tours in some of the most prestigious theaters in America, Asia and Europe. 
Jusid holds a Master of Music degree from The Manhattan School of Music, New York; a New England CSS, Boston; and Diplôme de Exécution Musicale with an Antorchas Foundation scholarship held at Brussels, apart from his bachelor's degree from the Buenos Aires Conservatory.
Jusid grew up among cutting rooms and film sets and soon his passion for music and film melted into a single focus that began with his first film scoring commission in 1994.

Career 

His latest works are Kidnap (Luis Prieto), with Halle Berry, Happy 140 (Gracia Querejeta), Magallanes (Salvador del Solar), Francis, Father Jorge (Beda Docampo Feijóo) based on the life of Pope Francis I, and additional compositions for the score composed by Alberto Iglesias for Ridley Scott's Exodus: Gods and Kings.
Other notable film credits include the feature films Everybody Has a Plan (Twentieth Century Fox – Dir. Anna Piterbarg and starred by Viggo Mortensen), The Unexpected Life (Jorge Torregrossa), Getúlio (Joao Jardim), Betibú (Miguel Cohan), The Ignorance of the Blood (Manuel Gómez Pereira), Say I Do (Columbia Pictures – Juan Calvo); The Getaway (Eduardo Mignona), The Minder (Rodrigo Moreno), Fermat's Room (Luis Piedrahíta & Rodrigo Sopeña), The Hidden Face (Twentieth Century Fox – Andrés Baiz), I Want to Be a Soldier (Warner – Dir. Christian Molina), Che, A New Man (Documentary Film, Dir. Tristán Bauer), Hold Up!  (Dir. Eduard Cortés), and internationally acclaimed The Secret in Their Eyes (Dir. Juan José Campanella), Oscar winner for Best Foreign Film, and nominated for the XXIV Goya Award for Best Original Score.
His scores for television series include but are not limited to Isabel, My Queen, Charles, King Emperor, Under Suspicion, The Refugees (co-production with BBC International), Gran Reserva, La Señora, 14 de abril. La República, Los Simuladores, Hermanos y Detectives and The Mysteries of Laura.
Other distinctions for his work on cinema and television include IFMCA International Film Music Critics Association 2012 and 2013 for the Score of Isabel, My Queen which also won the Reel Music Award 2013 for Best TV Series Score; Best Original Score at the Havana Film Festival 2010, Best Original Score at the Clarin Awards 2010 in Buenos Aires, First prize Silver Condor Award from the Argentine Film Critics Association 2010, all for the film The Secret in Their Eyes; Best Original Score at the 12th Latin-American Film Festival of Trieste (Italy) 2006 for the Film Olga, Victoria Olga; First prize "Linterna" Audience award for the original soundtrack of the film Rodrigo, la película Programme El Acomodador, 2001; First Prize Pentagrama de Oro 2001, for the original soundtrack for the film The Getaway at the Mar del Plata International Film Festival; First prize Silver Condor Award for Best Film Score of the year for Bajo Bandera from the Argentine Film Critics Association 1998.

Concerts and Performances 

Federico Jusid shares his filmscoring activity with another passion, composing for the Concert Hall and performing as concerto pianist. His latest compositions include the piece Tango Rhapsody, for two pianos and symphonic orchestra, commissioned by the Martha Argerich Project for the International Music Festival of Lugano; Enigmas, a theatrical piece for piano and ensemble commissioned by the University of Alcalá de Henares (Madrid) in its 5th Century Anniversary;  Finding Sarasate, commissioned by the University of Navarra to premiere on a Tribute Concert to Spanish composer Pablo Sarasate; and La Librería del Ingenioso Hidalgo, commissioned for the IV Centenary of Don Quixote's celebrations. 
As piano interpreter Jusid has performed as a soloist in numerous tours in some of the most prestigious theaters in America, Asia and Europe, including the Carnegie Weill Hall, New York; Teatro Colón, Buenos Aires; Theater Platz, Frankfurt; Israel Philharmonic Orchestra House, Tel Aviv; St. Petersburg Philharmonic Hall, St. Petersburg; National Conservatory of China, Beijing; National Conservatory of Spain, Madrid, among others; He has also performed in Paris, Rome, Seoul, Shanghai, Sicily, Stockholm, Sofia, Helsinki, Buenos Aires, Madrid, Málaga and Aarau among other cities around the world.
Also as a resident performer of the Sonor Ensemble directed by Mtro. Luis Aguirre, Jusid has toured throughout Spain, Europe, South America and Asia.
Both his music for the concert hall and his film and television scores have been performed by international orchestras and soloists.

Works

Film Music

Television Music

Awards

References

External links 
 Official website
 
 Federico Jusid´s interview on El País
 Federico Jusid at ScoreMagacine
 Federico Jusid´s interview on Miradas 2 Televisión Española

Argentine film score composers
Male film score composers
Musicians from Buenos Aires
1973 births
Living people